The Kawasaki Z750 is a  inline-four engine standard motorcycle made by Kawasaki from 2004 to 2012. It is a smaller version of the Kawasaki Z1000.

The Kawasaki Z750 was launched in 2004 as an economy model, after its bigger brother, the Z1000 in 2003. It uses a 750 cc sleeved down version of the Z1000 engine, a cheaper front suspension and a conventional exhaust. Like the Z1000, which is considered a modern version of the Kawasaki Z900/Z1, the Z750 is considered a modern take on the Kawasaki Z750RS Z2. In 2007, Kawasaki launched a revised version of both the Z750 and the Z1000, with many stylistic and mechanical changes. In 2011, alongside the standard Z750, Kawasaki launched the Z750R, which has upgraded suspension and brakes components and a lightly revised styling.

Variants and timeline

In 2004, Kawasaki launched the first model of the Z750. This was considered as Kawasaki's new middle-weight conceived to rival the Honda Hornet, Yamaha FZ6 Fazer and Suzuki SV650, but with extra performance from the larger displacement engine. Kawasaki Europe's Kenji Nagahara stated: "Our strategy was to make a budget bike, but we wanted something different. Manufacturing a 750 isn't really any more expensive than building a 600. And with many parts common to the Z1000, we were able to offer the 750 at the right price. In essence, the 750 is a sleeved down Z1000 using some cheaper, lower-spec components.". 

In 2005, Kawasaki launched the Z750S, a touring variant. This version has a single long seat instead of the two-part seat on the Z750, half fairing for wind protection, and excludes the rear tire  hugger fender found on the unfaired Z750. The S version uses an analog speedometer and tachometer taken from Kawasaki's super sport ZX-R models instead of the digital instrument cluster. Other differences include a slightly lower seat, grab rails and ZX10 style rear brake lights.

In 2007, Kawasaki launched a newer version of the Z750 with a bikini fairing. The engine has less vibration and is revised for more low-end torque. The front suspension is an upside down fork. The front and rear disk brakes use a petal design. 
In 2011, Kawasaki launched the Z750R alongside the standard Z750. This model resembles the 2007 to 2012 Z750, with upgraded front suspension, a rear suspension piggyback nitrogen reservoir, radial front brake calipers with metal-braided brake lines, an aluminum swingarm and black instrumentation. The headlight cluster, front mudguard and front and rear indicators were also redesigned for a sportier look.
In 2012, Kawasaki introduces the Z800 which replaces the Z750. The Z800 has an increased bore size and body styling changes and was introduced to compete with the Yamaha FZ8.

Specifications

See also 
 List of Kawasaki Z series machines from 1972

References

External links
 Kawasaki Z750 review Road tests of both the old and new shape Z750
 Kawasaki Z750R review Road test of the Z750R

Z750
Standard motorcycles
Motorcycles introduced in 2004